Thomas Sankey (24 October 1891 – 1974) was an English professional footballer who played as a forward.

References

1891 births
1974 deaths
People from Stanton Hill
Footballers from Nottinghamshire
English footballers
Association football forwards
Huthwaite Colliery F.C. players
Grimsby Town F.C. players
English Football League players